Genau in diesem Ton (English: Take that exact tone) is the fifth studio album by German pop-punk band Jennifer Rostock. It was released on 9 September 2016 by Four Music, following the expiration of their recording contract with Warner Music Group in 2014. The album became available for pre-order on all music digital distribution platforms on 8 July 2016. Alongside the pre-order, the album's lead single "Irgendwas ist immer" and a further track titled "Wir sind alle nicht von hier" were released. Since the announcement of the album, the band has further teased the new music through the release of promotional singles "Uns gehört die Nacht" and "Wir waren hier".

Title 
In an interview at the 2016 Open Flair Festival in Eschwege Johannes Walter claimed that Genau in diesem Ton refers to both the musical and the lyrical features on the record. According to Walter, the title should represent the rebellious and more straight forward sound of the record.

Track listings

Personnel
Credits adapted from the liner notes of Genau in diesem Ton.

 Jennifer Weist – vocals, composer, producer
 Alexander Voigt – guitar, vocals, composer, producer
 Christopher Kohl – drums, vocals, composer, producer
 Christoph Deckert –  bass, vocals, composer, producer design, layout
 Johannes Walter – keyboards, vocals, composer, producer
 Elmar Weyland – composer, additional guitar 
 Philipp Klemz – additional vocals 

 Jay Maas - producer
 Alex Lys - composer, keyboards, additional guitar 
 Moritz Enders – mixing
 Yunus "Kingsize" Cimen – additional mixing 
 Robin Schmidt – mastering
 Birte Filmer – photography
 spring – design, layout

Charts

References

2016 albums
German-language albums